Charles Courtney (born October 11, 1940) is an American professional golfer who played on the PGA Tour in the 1960s and 1970s.

Courtney was born in Minneapolis, Minnesota and raised in San Diego, California. He attended San Diego State University, where he was a three-time All-American as a member of the golf team: second team in 1960 and 1961, first team in 1962.

Courtney turned professional in 1963. For more than a decade, he played on the PGA Tour, where he had two wins and more than two dozen top-10 finishes. He was the head professional at Rancho Santa Fe Golf Club in Rancho Santa Fe, California for two decades starting in 1983. He is now golf professional emeritus. He was inducted into the San Diego State University Athletics Hall of Fame in 1991.

Amateur wins
1958 San Diego City Amateur
1960 San Diego City Amateur
1960 San Diego County Open

Professional wins (4)

PGA Tour wins (2)

PGA Tour playoff record (0–1)

Other wins (2)
1965 Montebello Open
1967 Puerto Rico Open

References

External links

American male golfers
San Diego State Aztecs men's golfers
PGA Tour golfers
Golfers from Minneapolis
Golfers from San Diego
1940 births
Living people